John Stroud (born October 29, 1957) is an American former basketball player and coach who played four years at the University of Mississippi, before being drafted by the Houston Rockets in the second round of 1980 NBA Draft as their first pick.  Following his playing career Stroud coached for 32 years at various levels.

Biography

College career 
Stroud signed with the University of Mississippi out of West Union High School in Union County, Mississippi where he had received both all state and All America honors.  He played for the Rebels from 1976 until 1980.  In 1978-79 he led the SEC in scoring with 26.3 points per game and was named as an All-America honorable mention. He again led the SEC in scoring in 1979-80 with 25.2 points per game. During his time at Ole miss he led the Rebels to their first postseason tournament victory over Grambling 76-74 at Tad Smith Coliseum in the National Invitational Tournament.

During his career in Oxford Stroud recorded the highest career point total in Ole Miss history and is still the third-most in league history with 2,328 points and sixth in field goals made in the SEC with 894. He is fifth in free throws made in a season at 233. Only Pete Maravich and Bailey Howell made more free throws in a season. Only five players have attempted more free throws in a single season in the SEC than Stroud. His 39 points in the first round of the 1979 SEC tournament ranks as the second most points ever scored in an SEC tournament game. Likewise, his 15 field goals in that game are the second most in a tournament game. Following his senior season in '79-80 Stroud was selected to All-America honors for the second straight season and named SEC Athlete of the year.

College statistics 
 Cited from Basketball Reference.

Professional career 
Following his senior year at Ole Miss, Stroud was the top choice of the Houston Rockets in the 1980 NBA draft. He played with the Rockets from 1980-1981 and was a member of the 1981 team that lost to the Boston Celtics in the NBA Finals. Stroud played the 1982-83 season in Europe with Caja de Ronda, located in Malaga, Spain.

Coaching career

University of Alabama (Mens)
After a three-year professional career, Stroud entered the coaching profession in 1984 as a graduate assistant at the University of Alabama.

New Albany High School
In 1985, he became the head basketball coach at W.P. Daniel High School in New Albany, Mississippi, where helmed the boy's program to back-to-back state championships in 1986 and 87.  He compiled a 71-24 record in three years.

East Mississippi Community College
In 1988, Stroud accepted the head coaching position at East Mississippi Community College in Scooba, Mississippi. Making an immediate impact in Scooba, Stroud led EMCC to its first-ever state tournament appearance and its first regional tournament appearance in 25 years. In his two seasons at EMCC, Stroud compiled a 30-30 record and was named the Mississippi Junior College Coach of the Year following the 1989-90 season before assuming the reins of the Millsaps' basketball program the following year.

Millsaps College
Stroud began an illustrious career at Millsaps in 1990. During his thirteen-year tenure, Stroud guided his teams to three Southern Collegiate Athletic Conference championships and led the Majors to three NCAA tournament appearances. The two-time SCAC Coach of the Year and the all-time wins leader at Millsaps, Stroud compiled a record of 204-131, reaching the 200-victory plateau this season in a 71-48 triumph over Rose-Hulman Institute of Technology on January 31, 2003. Suffering only two losing seasons while at Millsaps, Stroud posted seven seasons of at least sixteen wins, including three campaigns of twenty wins or more. Stroud's best year came in 1994-1995 as he led the Majors to a 25-3 mark, an SCAC title, and a trip to the NCAA Division III Sweet 16. Upon his retirement from Millsaps then President Frances Lucas-Tauchar commented, "John has given Millsaps College thirteen years of superior leadership and coaching. He is also a personal role model, which is the ultimate form of teaching, and he will be greatly missed."

Business Career 
Stroud returned to New Albany in 2003 and went into private business. He first purchased an insurance agency and later opened a Dry Cleaners. He has subsequently been inducted into the SEC Business Hall of Fame.

Return to Coaching

New Albany High School (Girls)
In 2004 he became coach of the girls team at New Albany High School where he compiled a 248-131 record over 13 years and won the Class 4A state title in 2011. New Albany also made appearances in the MHSAA's state tournament in 2009 as a semifinalist, 2010 where the team finished as the Class 4A runner-up, and 2015 when the Lady Bulldogs lost in triple overtime to Bay High School in the quarterfinal round.

He retired yet again from coaching in 2017.

Awards and honors

As high school player 

 All-America, All-State (’76)
 MS High School All Star game (’76)
 Baseball letterman

As collegiate player 

 Ended Career with 2,328 points; #2 All-Time SEC scoring behind Pete Maravich at the time, currently #3
 Three-time Coaches All-SEC team (’78-’80)
 Two-time Consensus All-SEC, AP, & UPI (’79, ‘80)
 SEC Player of the Year, Tuscaloosa, AL, Tip-Off Club (’78)
 SEC Athlete of the Year (’80)
 Two-time SEC scoring leader (’79, ‘80)
 Mississippi Amateur Athlete of the Year (’80)
 Team Captain (’80)
 3rd team All America, AP (’80)
 Honorable Mention All American, AP (’79)
 Team MVP (’79, ‘80)
 MVP Sugar Bowl Tournament (’80)
 Holds numerous school records including made field goals & free throws; consecutive double figure scoring (61 games)
 Selected to the Ole Miss Men's Basketball CellularSouth All-Century Team

As coach

At Millsaps College 

 Two-time SCAC Coach of the Year
 All-time wins leader 
 Seven seasons of at least sixteen wins
 Three season of twenty wins or more 
 1995 SCAC title
 NCAA Division III Sweet 16.

In High School 

 Back-to-back boys state championships in 1986 and 1987. 
 Girls state championship in 2011

As Business Executive 
 Regions SEC Business Hall of Fame

Hall of Fame Memberships 
 Ole Miss Student Hall of Fame, Colonel Rebel & Student Senate (1980)
 Outstanding Young Men of America (1987)
 Runner-up Clarion Ledger's Most Popular Athlete MS sports history (1989)
 West Union HS Alumni Hall of Fame (1991)
 Ole Miss Athletic Hall of Fame (1995)
 SEC Living Legends Team, Atlanta, GA (1999)
 Millsaps Athletic Hall of Fame (2005)
 SEC Business Hall of Fame (2007)
 Mississippi Sports Hall of Fame (2009)

Personal life

References 

1957 births
Living people
All-American college men's basketball players
American men's basketball players
Basketball coaches from Mississippi
Basketball players from Mississippi
College men's basketball head coaches in the United States
High school basketball coaches in the United States
Houston Rockets draft picks
Houston Rockets players
Junior college men's basketball coaches in the United States
Millsaps Majors men's basketball coaches
Ole Miss Rebels men's basketball players
People from New Albany, Mississippi
Small forwards